Justice, born Lauren Justice, is an American female pop recording artist.

Music
Her 2012 debut single, "Find a Way", a pop dance track featuring Sean-Gemini, reached No. 30 on the Billboard Indicator Chart and was featured for nine consecutive weeks.

Justice's second radio single, "By My Side" (2013), reached No. 34 on the Billboard Indicator Chart.  The music video was released March 19, 2013 and has received over 900,000 YouTube views.

Discography

Singles
"Find a Way" (feat. Sean-Gemini) (March 2012) (produced by Jean-Michel Soupraya, written by Lauren Justice, Sean-Gemini, Franck Gelibert & Jean-Michel Soupraya)
"By My Side" (March 2013) (produced by Jean-Michel Soupraya, written by Lauren Justice, Franck Gelibert & Jean-Michel Soupraya

References

1985 births
Living people
People from Lake Arrowhead, California
Singers from California